The 1999 Philadelphia mayoral election saw the narrow election of Democrat John F. Street.

Democratic primary

Candidates

Declared
 Queena Bass, activist and former Thomas Jefferson University Hospital employee
 Dwight Evans, State Representative from the 203rd district 
 Happy Fernandez, At-Large City Councilwoman
 John F. Street, City Councilman from District 5
 Martin Weinberg, judge and former City Solicitor
 John F. White, Jr., former City Councilman from District 9 and State Representative from the 200th district

Declined
 Ed Rendell, incumbent Mayor

Results

Republican primary

Candidates

Declared
 Sam Katz, candidate for Mayor in 1991

Results

Sam Katz was unopposed for the Republican nomination.

General election

Results

References

External links
 Franklin & Marshall College page on the election

1990s in Philadelphia
Philadelphia
1999 Pennsylvania elections
1999